List of Keikyu Corporation stations lists stations on the Keikyu network, including station location (ward or city), opening date, design (underground, at-grade, or elevated), and daily ridership.

Summary
There are a total of 73 "unique" stations (i.e., counting stations served by multiple lines only once) on the Keikyu network, or 77 total stations if each station on each line counts as one station.

In general, the reported daily ridership is the total of faregate entries and exits at each station. For "interface" stations that allow for through-servicing and transfers with other railways without exiting the station's paid area (namely, Sengakuji), the daily ridership also includes cross-company passengers on through-servicing trains (as part of trackage rights agreements) or transferring from other railways' trains without passing through faregates. At faregate-controlled interchanges with other railways, additional data is also provided on passengers transferring from other railways, and at junction stations on the Keikyu network (e.g., Keikyū Kamata or Horinouchi), data is also provided on the total passenger volume exchanged between the main line and branch line.

Opening dates are given in standard Japanese date format (YYYY.MM.DD).

Stations

References

Keikyu Corporation stations
Keikyu Corporation stations